Plato's Academy mosaic is a work of visual art created in the villa of T. Siminius Stephanus in Pompeii, around 100 BC to 79 AD. Of mosaic construction, it has roughly square dimensions, and is about the size of a large dinner plate. 

It depicts seven prominent human figures associated with Plato's Academy, in classical attire of toga and sandals, gathered under a tree, against a backdrop of allusive elements, including stone columns suggestive of the grand civic architecture of the age, and glimpses of distant shores or havens, perhaps metaphysical in nature. Since its discovery in 1897 many hypotheses about the personages and the meaning of the representation have been proposed.

Overview
The mosaic has been interpreted to depict as the central figure Plato pointing with a stick at the globe. Mattusch (2008) suggests for the other figures, the Greek philosophers and scholars: Thales, Anaxagoras, Pythagoras, Xenophanes, Democritus, Eudoxus, Euctemon, Callippus, Meton, Philippus, Hipparchus, and Aratus. However, Mattusch also points out that the number of figures could relate to the Seven Sages of Greece, and points out that the sages often had fluid identities. David Sedley identifies the figures as Timaeus, Eudoxus, Plato, Xenocrates, Archytas, Speusippus and Aristotle.

A strikingly similar mosaic has been found in Sarsina (now at Villa Albani) and as it has been dated after the volcanic eruption at Pompeii, a common source has been reasonably conjectured.  Also Rowe and Rees noted that a set of sculptures found at Memphis showed some similarity.

See also
Villa of the Papyri
The School of Athens

References

Cultural depictions of philosophers
Cultural depictions of Plato
Pompeii (ancient city)
Roman mosaics
Roman Empire art